Tropical Storm Ewiniar was a tropical cyclone in early June 2018 that brought prolonged heavy rains to Vietnam and South China, causing damaging floods and landslides. The fourth named storm of the 2018 Pacific typhoon season, Ewiniar developed as a tropical depression just east of Vietnam on June 2. The system moved generally northwards over the South China Sea, before intensifying into a tropical storm near the Qiongzhou Strait on June 5. Ewiniar proceeded to stall over the region as steering currents collapsed, making landfall over the Leizhou Peninsula and later over northern Hainan. The storm made landfall in eastern Guangdong shortly thereafter and weakened into a tropical depression on June 8. The system ultimately dissipated east of Taiwan on June 11.

In combination with the southwest monsoon, Ewiniar dumped heavy rain over Vietnam and South China for over a week. In Vietnam, a few houses were damaged and one person was killed. Roads in Ho Chi Minh City were inundated. In Hainan and Guangdong, over a hundred flights were cancelled and ships were forced to return to port to take shelter. Daily rainfall records for June were set in eight cities. Landslides killed five people in Yunfu and left one missing in Jiangmen. Strong winds blew down a construction site in Guangzhou, killing one and injuring eight, and caused a building collapse in Shenzhen that killed four and injured four others. Another two people were electrocuted by faulty wiring. A tornado occurred in Foshan, damaging a market and three vehicles. Travel disruptions also posed difficulties for students taking the National College Entrance Examination. A total of 13 people were killed in South China and direct economic losses were valued at ¥5.19 billion (US$ million). In Hong Kong and Macao, strong wind signals were issued and some schools were closed. Gusty winds felled trees and heavy rains caused flash flooding, while a waterspout was sighted near Cheung Chau.

Meteorological history

Ewiniar originated from an area of scattered thunderstorms that developed just southeast of Puerto Princesa on May 31. The system moved northwest and consolidated, with the Joint Typhoon Warning Center (JTWC) determining that it consolidated into a tropical depression at 12:00 UTC on June 2. The depression, pushed northwest by a subtropical ridge to its northeast, organized only slowly amid an environment marginally conducive to intensification, with wind shear limiting convection mostly to the depression's western flank. The depression changed little in strength on June 3 and 4 as it turned further north around the western edge of the aforementioned ridge, eventually curving to the north-northeast on June 5. Around this time, thunderstorm activity increased in coverage with the development of outflow channels; as a result, the JMA upgraded the depression to Tropical Storm Ewiniar at 00:00 UTC. Wind shear decreased later on June 5, allowing Ewiniar to maintain thunderstorms near its center and intensify slightly. The JTWC upgraded the system to a tropical storm at 18:00 UTC as the storm's motion slowed and turned back to the northwest.

The subtropical ridge steering the storm collapsed thereafter, leaving Ewiniar in a zone of weak steering currents over the Qiongzhou Strait. The system made landfall in Xuwen, Guangdong, at 22:25 UTC on June 5, before turning southwest and making another landfall in Haikou, Hainan, at 06:50 UTC on June 6. While over the Leizhou Peninsula, the JTWC assessed that Ewiniar weakened back into a tropical depression, whereas the JMA maintained the system at tropical storm intensity. On June 7, Ewiniar finally began to accelerate east-northeastwards ahead of a shortwave trough. Ewiniar then turned to the north-northeast as it began to interact with the Meiyu front, before making a third landfall in Yangjiang, Guangdong, at 12:30 UTC June 7. Once inland, the system soon became embedded within the Meiyu front and the JTWC declared that Ewiniar dissipated as a tropical cyclone near midday on June 8. The JMA, however, continued to track Ewiniar as a tropical depression while the system turned back east and emerged over the South China Sea on June 10. After crossing Taiwan on June 11, Ewiniar was finally declared to have dissipated by the JMA.

Preparations and impact

Vietnam
Ewiniar combined with the southwest monsoon to produce thunderstorms and gusty winds over Vietnam. Farmers were urged to complete the rice harvest before the onset of heavy rain. Tourists were evacuated from the Chàm Islands, while about 2,000 tourists were stranded on Lý Sơn Island. Landslides damaged three houses in Lào Cai Province and two more in Thanh Hóa Province, while floods washed away two houses in Cao Bằng Province. A person was killed in Quan Sơn District.

Mainland China
Ewiniar brought heavy rain to South China and Jiangnan for seven days, affecting 211,200 people with floods and landslides. Eight cities saw new records for highest daily rainfall in June. In Hainan, schools were closed in the capital Haikou. About 5,530 people (mostly fishermen) were moved to safety. High-speed rail services around the island were suspended and the Yuehai Ferry halted operations, while dozens of flights were cancelled at Haikou Meilan International Airport and Sanya Phoenix International Airport. The Qiongzhou Strait was closed to passenger ships on June 4 and 5. In Guangdong, 73,000 residents were evacuated to over 3,000 emergency shelters. At Guangzhou Baiyun International Airport, 73 outbound flights and 71 inbound flights were cancelled. A total of 404 ships docked in the Port of Zhanjiang for shelter.

The passage of Ewiniar resulted in 13 fatalities and ¥5.19 billion (US$ million) of damage. Landslides killed five people in Xinxing County and caused another person in Jiangmen to go missing. In Foshan, two women died after being electrocuted by faulty electrical wiring on a digital billboard at a bus stop. Ewiniar also spawned a tornado in Dali, which blew off a market's  roof and damaged three cars but caused no casualties. A construction site in Nansha District collapsed under strong winds, killing one and injuring eight others. Heavy rain caused the exterior of a building in Longgang District, Shenzhen, to collapse, resulting in four deaths and four injuries. Roads were blocked by floods in Haikou, disrupting traffic. Floods occurred during the National College Entrance Examinations on June 7–8, obstructing students' travel. Police and firefighters were dispatched to ensure students and teachers could reach their examination centers safely and on time. In Zhaoqing, 200 students were ferried to their examination centers using trucks, dinghies, and steamboats. Insured losses in Guangdong (excluding the city of Shenzhen) were approximately ¥300 million (US$ million). Authorities allocated ¥290,000 (US$) of funds for disaster relief and distributed bottled water, food, tents, beds, and towels to displaced residents.

Hong Kong and Macao
Ewiniar was the first tropical cyclone to affect Hong Kong in 2018. The system brought flooding rain and squalls to Hong Kong from June 5–8. The No. 3 Strong Wind Signal was raised over the territory from June 7–8, during which kindergartens and schools for children with disabilities were closed and bunker operations at the Port of Hong Kong were suspended. Fallen trees damaged vehicles and obstructed traffic, with one such incident in Sai Wan Ho resulting in an injury. Flooding occurred in several areas in the city, with reported incidents in Kam Shan, Diamond Hill, and Man Kam To. A waterspout was sighted near Cheung Chau on June 7. In neighboring Macao, the No. 3 Strong Wind Signal was also issued from June 7–8. Rainfall accumulations from June 6–8 reached .

See also

Other tropical cyclones named Ewiniar
Weather of 2018
Tropical cyclones in 2018
Tropical Storm Russ (1994) – another damaging June system that brought severe flooding to South China
Tropical Storm Hagibis (2014) – brought torrential rainfall to Guangdong in June

Notes

References

External links

JMA General Information on Tropical Storm Ewiniar (1804) from Digital Typhoon
JMA Best Track Data for Tropical Storm Ewiniar (1804)
JMA Best Track Data (Graphics) for Tropical Storm Ewiniar (1804)
JMA Best Track Data (Text)
05W.EWINIAR from the U.S. Naval Research Laboratory

2018 Pacific typhoon season
2018 disasters in China
Typhoons in China
Western Pacific tropical storms
Ewiniar